James David Smith (born 11 October 1988) is an Australian former cricketer. A right-handed batsman and occasional right-arm off break bowler, he played first-class cricket for South Australia between 2007 and 2012. He scored a century against Tasmania in late 2009, but did not repeat the feat again at state level. He was released by South Australia at the end of the 2012–13 season. In all, he scored 1,272 runs in 27 first-class matches at an average of 26.50. He also appeared ten times in List A matches, and twice in Twenty20 competitions, making one Big Bash League appearance, for the Adelaide Strikers in late 2012.

He is the older brother of Kelvin Smith, who made his debut for South Australia in the season following James' release.

References

South Australia cricketers
1988 births
Living people
Australian cricketers
Adelaide Strikers cricketers